Guy Graham (born 29 August 1998) is a Scottish professional rugby league footballer who plays as a  for Whitehaven in the Betfred Championship and Scotland at international level.

Background
Graham was born in Stirling, Scotland. He is the son of former Carlisle player George Graham.

Playing career

Club career
Graham joined Whitehaven on trial in early 2020 and was later rewarded with a deal from the 2021 season.

International career
In 2022 Graham was named in the Scotland squad for the 2021 Rugby League World Cup.

References

External links
Scotland RL profile
Scotland profile

1998 births
Living people
Rugby league players from Stirling
Scottish rugby league players
Scotland national rugby league team players
Whitehaven R.L.F.C. players
Rugby league props